Bleddyn is a masculine, Welsh given name.

Other spellings of Bleddyn are: Blevin, Blevyn, Blethyn, Blethin, Blevins, Blethins, Blethyns, Plethyn, Plethin, Pleddyn, Plethin and many others.

List of bearers include:

Bleddyn ap Cynfyn (died 1075), Prince of the Welsh Kingdoms of Gwynedd and of Powys
Bleddyn Bowen (born 1961), former international Wales rugby union player
Bleddyn Fardd (1258–1284), Welsh-language court poet from Gwynedd
Bleddyn Taylor (born 1959), Welsh rugby union player
Bleddyn Williams MBE (born 1923), Welsh rugby union centre
Cadwgan ap Bleddyn (1051–1111), prince of Powys in eastern Wales
Iorwerth ap Bleddyn (1053–1111), prince of Powys in eastern Wales
Maredudd ap Bleddyn (1047–1132), prince of Powys in eastern Wales
Rhiryd ap Bleddyn (1049–1088), Welsh king of Powys
Bleddyn Môn (born 1991), Welsh sailor - America's Cup, Volvo Ocean Race and Extreme Sailing Series competitor

Welsh masculine given names